Nikolay Davydenko was the champion in 2009. He tried to defend his title, but lost to Juan Ignacio Chela in the quarterfinal.
Juan Carlos Ferrero won in the final over Potito Starace 6–4, 6–4.

Seeds
The top four seeds receive a bye into the second round.

Draw

Finals

Top half

Bottom half

References
Main Draw
Qualifying Singles

Singles